George Fredrick Mitchell (March 31, 1900 – November, 1953) was an American Negro league pitcher in the 1920s.

A native of Sparta, Illinois, Mitchell was the twin brother of fellow Negro leaguer Robert Mitchell. He made his Negro leagues debut in 1924 for the St. Louis Stars, where he was a batterymate of catching brother Robert. Mitchell went on to play for several teams through the 1930s, and later managed the Indianapolis ABCs and St. Louis–New Orleans Stars. He died in Sparta in 1953 at age 53.

References

External links
 and Baseball-Reference Black Baseball stats and Seamheads
  and Seamheads

1900 births
1953 deaths
Chicago American Giants players
Detroit Stars players
Indianapolis ABCs players
Indianapolis ABCs (1931–1933) players
Indianapolis ABCs (1938) players
Kansas City Monarchs players
Negro league baseball managers
St. Louis–New Orleans Stars players
St. Louis Stars (baseball) players
Baseball pitchers
Baseball players from Illinois
People from Sparta, Illinois
Twin sportspeople
American twins
20th-century African-American sportspeople